A by-election was held for the New South Wales Legislative Assembly electorate of Kiama on 2 July 1880 because of the resignation of Samuel Charles ahead of a long trip to Britain.

Dates

Results

Samuel Charles resigned.

See also
Electoral results for the district of Kiama
List of New South Wales state by-elections

References

1880 elections in Australia
New South Wales state by-elections
1880s in New South Wales